In mathematics, the coclass of a finite p-group of order pn is n − c, where c is the class.

The coclass conjectures

They are:

Conjecture A: Every p-group has a normal subgroup of class 2 with index depending only on p and its coclass.
Conjecture B: The solvable length of a p-group can be bounded in terms of p and the coclass. 
Conjecture C: A pro p-group of finite coclass is solvable.
Conjecture D: There are only finitely many pro p-groups of given coclass.
Conjecture E: There are only finitely many solvable pro p-groups of given coclass.

See also

Descendant tree (group theory)

References

 

P-groups